The 1996 Commonwealth of Independent States Cup was the fourth edition of the competition between the champions of former republics of Soviet Union. It was won by Dynamo Kyiv in their first participation in the competition, while Omari Tetradze (Alania Vladikavkaz) was honored as the Best player award. In a change from the previous years, top two teams of each group progressed through the first stage, and a quarterfinal round was played for the first time.

Participants

Group stage

Group A
Unofficial table

Official table

Results

Group B

Results

Group C

Results

Group D

Note: primary tie-breaker is head-to-head result.

Results

Final rounds

Quarterfinals

Semi-finals

Finals

Top scorers

External links
 1996 Commonwealth of Independent States Cup at RSSSF

1995
1996 in Russian football
1995–96 in Ukrainian football
1995–96 in European football
January 1996 sports events in Russia
February 1996 sports events in Russia
1996 in Moscow